The Passy National Nature Reserve is a nature reserve located on the face of the Aiguilles Rouges and Mont Blanc mountain ranges, in the middle of the Arve valley, in the Haute-Savoie metropolitan department of France.

The  have been protected since 1980; the reserve assures a continuous link of protected areas between the Sixt-Passy National Nature Reserve and the Aiguilles Rouges National Nature Reserve.

The natural history of the reserve mirrors that of the surrounding mountains. The young rock cliffs of the Fiz mountain range dominate the former Pormenaz mountain range. The tectonic activity of the Alps continues to bring the Fiz rock cliffs closer to the silicious rocks of the Pormenaz.

This mineralogical history caused a great diversity of land areas such as meadows, heaths, and wetlands, which are inhabited by numerous species such as eagles and Alpine Ibexes.

References

External links
  Association des Amis de la Réserve Naturelle de Passy Official Site

Nature reserves in France
Geography of Haute-Savoie
Protected areas established in 1980
Tourist attractions in Haute-Savoie